Maxime Teixeira was the defending champion.
Grégoire Burquier won the title by defeating Augustin Gensse 7–5, 6–7(5–7), 7–6(7–3) in the final.

Seeds

Draw

Finals

Top half

Bottom half

References
 Main Draw
 Qualifying Draw

Open Prevadies Saint-Brieuc - Singles
2012 Singles